Fred F. Steen II served as the chief lobbyist/legislative liaison for North Carolina Governor Pat McCrory until 2016 when McCrory appointed him to the Board of Review. From 2004 through 2012, Steen served as a Republican member of the North Carolina General Assembly representing the state's 76th House District, including constituents in Rowan County. A cost analyst from Landis, North Carolina, he served as the town's mayor for eight years until he was appointed on 16 February 2004 to fill the seat of W. Eugene McCombs, who died in office.

In 2011, Steen was ranked 4th in the North Carolina House for pro-business legislation by the North Carolina Free Enterprise Foundation.

On December 8, 2011, Steen announced he would not run for re-election to the NC House, but would instead run for the Republican nomination for North Carolina's 8th congressional district, then represented by Democrat Larry Kissell. He lost in the Republican primary.

While a legislator, he served on the board of directors of the American Legislative Exchange Council (ALEC), a national association of legislators.

Electoral history

Mayoral

State representative

Congressional

References

Republican Party members of the North Carolina House of Representatives
Living people
People from Landis, North Carolina
1960 births
21st-century American politicians